Gabriel Ferrand (1864–1935) was a French orientalist specialised on the Madagascar.

Biography 
Gabriel Ferrand was born at 22 of January on 1864 in France, Marseille and he died at 31 of January on 1935 in Paris. Gabriel Ferrand graduated from the School of Oriental Languages. Ferrand was an orientalist, writer and linguistic expert worked in Madagascar Also, he was the author of a Malagasy Essay and a Dictionary of the Language of Madagascar. He was a member of the Society of Linguistics of Paris and the Asian Society, and one of the editors of the Asian Journal.

Works related to Ibadism 
 Ferrand, Gabriel: (1924) L'élément persan dans les textes nautiques arabes des XVe et XVIe siècles. Offprint from: Journal Asiatique (Paris), April-June 1924, pp. 193-257.
 Ferrand, Gabriel: (1928) Les Sultans de Kilwa. Offprint from Publications de l'Institut des Hautes-Études Marocaines, vol. 17, 239-260. Mémorial Henri Basset. Nouvelles Études Nord- Africaines et Orientales. Paris: Librarie Orientaliste Paul Geuthner, 1928.

Other Works 
 Ferrand, Gabriel: Les Musulmans à Madagascar et aux îles Comores, 3 parties, Paris : E. Leroux, 1891-1902.
 Ferrand, Gabriel: populaires malgaches (recueillis, traduits et annotés par Gabriel Ferrand), Paris : E. Leroux, 1893.
 Ferrand, Gabriel: de grammaire malgache, Paris : E. Leroux, 1903.
 Ferrand, Gabriel: Dictionnaire de la langue de Madagascar d'après l'édition de 1658 et l'histoire de la grande Isle Madagascar de 1661, Paris : E. Leroux, 1905.
 Ferrand, Gabriel: Essai de phonétique comparée du malais et des dialectes malgaches (thèse pour le doctorat d'université, présentée à la Faculté des lettres de l'Université de Paris), Paris : Librairie orientaliste Paul Geuthner, 1909.
 Ferrand, Gabriel: Relations de voyages et textes géographiques arabes, persans et turks relatifs à l'Extrême-Orient du VIIIe au XVIIIe siècles (traduits, revus et annotés par Gabriel Ferrand), 2 volumes, Paris : E. Leroux, 1913-1914.
 Ferrand, Gabriel: Le Pilote des mers de l'Inde, de la Chine et de l'Indonésie (traduit de l'arabe par Gabriel Ferrand), 2 volumes, Paris : Librairie orientaliste Paul Geuthner, 1921-1923.
 Ferrand, Gabriel: Voyage du marchand arabe Sulaymân en Inde et en Chine, rédigé en 851 (traduit de l'arabe par Gabriel Ferrand), Paris : Bossard, 1922.

References

External links 
 Selected works of Gabriel Ferrand at Open Library project https://openlibrary.org/subjects/person:gabriel_ferrand_(1864-1935)

French orientalists
Ibadi studies
French scholars of Islam
1864 births
1935 deaths